Favre is a French surname. Notable people with the surname include:

Alphonse Favre (1815–1890), Swiss geologist
Brett Favre (born 1969), U.S. football player (NFL); husband of Deanna Favre
Claude Favre de Vaugelas (1585–1650), French grammarian
Corinne Favre (born 1970), French ski instructor and competitive ski mountaineer
Cristina Favre-Moretti (born 1963), Swiss ski mountaineer
Deanna Favre (born 1968), U.S. breast cancer activist; wife of Brett Favre
Émilie Favre (born 1992), French ski mountaineer
Gilbert Favre (1936–1998), Bolivian flautist
Jules Favre (1809–1880), French statesman
Jules Favre (naturalist) (1882–1959), Swiss naturalist
Julie Favre (1833–1896), French philosopher and educator
Louis Favre (disambiguation), multiple people
Lucien Favre (born 1957), Swiss footballer and manager
Luis Favre, pen name of Felipe Belisario Wermus (born 1949), Brazilian journalist and political activist; husband of ideMarta Suplicy, a former mayor of São Paulo
Philippe Favre (1961–2013), Swiss racing driver
St. Pierre Favre, known as "Peter Faber" (1506–1546), co-founder of the Society of Jesus
Pierre Favre (musician) (born 1937), Swiss jazz drummer
Pierre Antoine Favre (1813–1880), French chemist
Sandrine Favre (born 1988), French ski mountaineer
Simon Favre (1760–1813), U.S. interpreter of Muskogean languages; ancestor of Brett Favre
Valentin Favre (born 1987), French ski mountaineer

French-language surnames